Live, Love and Learn is a 1937 romantic comedy film starring Robert Montgomery, Rosalind Russell, and Robert Benchley.  The movie was directed by George Fitzmaurice.

Plot summary

Cast
 Robert Montgomery as Bob Graham
 Rosalind Russell as Julie Stoddard
 Robert Benchley as Oscar
 Helen Vinson as Lily Chalmers
 Monty Woolley as Mr. Bawltitude
 E.E. Clive as Mr. Palmiston
 Mickey Rooney as Jerry Crump
 Charles Judels as Pedro Felipe
 Maude Eburne as Mrs. Crump
 Harlan Briggs as Justice of the Peace
 June Clayworth as Annabella Post
 Barnett Parker as Alfredo
 Al Shean as Professor Fraum

Reception
Andre Sennwald wrote in The New York Times, "The principal distinction of this unexpected preachment in behalf of the hard, Cezanne way in art (using that Greenwich Village master, Robert Montgomery, as an object lesson) is that it affords a reasonably adequate vehicle for the graduation out of very funny shorts into a not-too-funny feature-length production, of Robert Benchley, who plays a character called Oscar".

References

External links
 
 
 
 

1937 films
1937 romantic comedy films
American romantic comedy films
American black-and-white films
Films directed by George Fitzmaurice
Metro-Goldwyn-Mayer films
Films with screenplays by Charles Brackett
Films produced by Harry Rapf
Films with screenplays by Richard Maibaum
Films scored by Edward Ward (composer)
1930s English-language films
1930s American films